Mihr-Narseh, was a powerful Iranian dignitary from the House of Suren, who served as minister of the Sasanian shahanshahs Yazdegerd I, Bahram V, Yazdegerd II and Peroz I. According to the Iranologist Richard N. Frye, Mihr-Narseh was the "prototype of the later Islamic grand vizier."

Notable for his religious zeal, Mihr-Narseh was the architect behind the Roman–Sasanian War of 421–422 and the Battle of Avarayr.

Etymology 

Background 
Mihr-Narseh was born in the 4th-century in the village of Abruwan in the rural district of Dasht-e Barin in the administrative division of Ardashir-Khwarrah, in southwestern Pars. He belonged to the House of Suren, one of the Seven Great Houses of Iran. The family, of Parthian origin, had been active in Iranian politics since the Arsacid Empire, and held parts of Sakastan as their personal fiefdom. It was thus unusual for a Surenid to be a native of Pars, which illustrates their extensive authority and influence during this period, which made them able to spread their influence to Pars, the homeland of the ruling Persian Sasanian family. It is unknown if the Suren branch of Pars adopted the title of Parsig (Persian). Mihr-Narseh's father was a certain Boraza, who may have owned the land he was born in. According to the medieval historian al-Tabari (d. 923), Mihr-Narseh traced his descent back to the legendary Kayanian king Vishtaspa and the first Arsacid king, Arsaces I.

Career 

During the reign of Yazdegerd I, Mihr-Narseh was appointed his minister; this probably took place after some Christians had destroyed Zoroastrian fire temples, which resulted in a withdrawal of Yazdegerd I's tolerant policies, and led to the persecutions of the Christians. Mihr-Narseh continued to maintain the position under Bahram V, where Suren power reached its zenith. Mihr-Narseh's three sons also occupied high offices; Zurvandad served as the chief herbad of the empire; Mahgushnasp was the wastaryoshan salar ("chief agriculturalist"), which meant that he oversaw the affairs of the land tax; Kardar was the arteshtaran-salar ("chief of the warriors"), a rank, which according to al-Tabari, was higher than that of spahbed ("army chief"). The power and influence of the Suren family thus spread over the administrative, financial, and military affairs of the Sasanian Empire. They would continue to enjoy such as high status under Bahram's son and successor Yazdegerd II as well. Mihr-Narseh was the prime instigator of the Roman–Sasanian War of 421–422, and himself led the army in battle. In 453, Yazdegerd II moved his court to Nishapur in Abarshahr to face the threat from the Kidarites and left Mihr-Narseh in charge of the Sasanian realm.

One of Yazdegerd II's policies was to integrate the Christian nobility into the bureaucracy by forcing them to convert to Zoroastrianism, which led to a major rebellion in Armenia. The cause of the rebellion was the attempt of Mihr-Narseh to impose the Zurvanite variant of Zoroastrianism in Armenia. His intentions differed from those of Yazdegerd II. As a result, many of the Armenian nobles (but not all) rallied under Vardan Mamikonian, the supreme commander (sparapet) of Armenia. The Armenian rebels tried to appeal to the Romans for help, but to no avail. Meanwhile, another faction of Armenians, led by the marzban Vasak Siwni allied themselves with the Sasanians. On 2 June 451, the Sasanian and rebel forces clashed at Avarayr, with the Sasanians emerging victorious. Nine generals, including Vardan Mamikonian, were killed, with a large number of the Armenian nobles and soldiers meeting the same fate. The Sasanians, however, had also suffered heavy losses due to the resolute struggle by the Armenian rebels. Under Peroz I, Zurvanism was seemingly rejected, although Mihr-Narseh kept his post as minister. Mihr-Narseh later retired in Pars.

Constructions 

In the early 5th-century, Mihr-Narseh had a bridge built in Gor. An inscription was also written on the bridge, which says; "This bridge was built by order of Mihr-Narseh, wuzurg framadar, for his soul's sake and at his own expense... Whoever has come on this road let him give a blessing to Mihr-Narseh and his sons for that he thus bridged this crossing." Furthermore, he also founded four villages with a fire-temple in each of them. The name of the fire-temples were; Faraz-mara-awar-khwadaya, Zurvandadan, Kardadan, and Mahgushnaspan. He had a fifth fire-temple constructed in Abruwan, which may have been the Barin fire-temple that the 10th-century geographer Istakhri visited, who stated that the fire-temple had an inscription that stated 30,000 dirhams was spent for its construction.

References

Sources

Further reading 
 

5th-century Iranian people
House of Suren
Viziers of the Sasanian Empire
5th-century deaths
4th-century births
Generals of Yazdegerd II
People from Fars Province